Sibeko is a surname. Notable people with the surname include:

 Archibald "Archie" Mncedisi Sibeko (1928–2018), South African political activist and trade unionist
 David Sibeko (1938–1979), South Africa politician and journalist
 Gerald Sibeko (born 1979), South African footballer
 Letitia Sibeko (1930–?), South African political activist, wife of Archie